The Stellas is the debut album by Canadian country music duo The Stellas. It was released on September 6, 2011, via EMI Music Canada. The Stellas wrote all of the songs on the album, except for a cover of Fairground Attraction's "Perfect" and a cover of The Everly Brothers' "Love Hurts" recorded live at Massey Hall.

Critical reception
Bruce Mitchell of Kelowna Capital News gave the album a B−, writing that "this solid retro country album and their recent tour gigs prove they are real talents on the rise."

Track listing

References

External links

2011 debut albums
The Stellas albums
EMI Records albums